Gorosthaney Sabdhan may refer to:
 Gorosthaney Sabdhan (novel), a 1977 novel by Satyajit Ray
 Gorosthaney Sabdhan (film), a 2010 film directed by Sandip Ray, based on the novel